Giovanni Battista Lorenzi (or Giambattista; 1721–1807) was an Italian librettist. He was born in Puglia and died in Naples and was a friend of Giovanni Paisiello, with whom he collaborated on numerous operas.

Libretti 
Fra i due litiganti il terzo gode (set by Giovanni Battista Pescetti, 1749)
Le gelosie (set by Niccolò Piccinni, 1755)
L'idolo cinese (set by Giovanni Paisiello, 1767; set by Giacomo Rust, 1773; set by Joseph Schuster, 1776)
Il furbo malaccorto (set by Giovanni Paisiello, 1767)
La luna abitata (set by Giovanni Paisiello, 1768)
La finta maga per vendetta (set by Giovanni Paisiello, 1768)
Il Don Chisciotte della Mancia (set by Giovanni Paisiello; set by Marcello Bernardini, 1769; set by Niccolò Piccinni, 1770; set by Giovanni Paisiello e Florian Leopold Gassmann, 1771, as Don Quischott von Mancia)
Gelosia per gelosia (set by Niccolò Piccinni, 1770)
La corsara (set by Niccolò Piccinni, 1771)
Gli amanti comici (set by Giovanni Paisiello, 1772)
Le trame zingaresche (set by Niccolò Piccinni, 1772)
Il tamburo (set by Giovanni Paisiello, 1773)
Il duello (set by Giovanni Paisiello, 1774)
Le finte zingarelle (set by Agostino Accorimboni, 1774)
Il divertimento de' numi (scherzo rappresentativo per musica; set by Giovanni Paisiello, 1774)
Socrate immaginario (set by Giovanni Paisiello, 1775; set by Giacomo Rust, 1776)
La fuga (set by Gaetano Monti, 1777)
Il geloso sincerato (set by Gaetano Monti, 1779; set by Giuseppe Nicolini, 1804)
L'infedeltà fedele (set by Domenico Cimarosa, 1779; set by Joseph Haydn, 1780, as L'infedeltà premiata)
I due gemelli (set by Giacomo Tritto, 1783; set by Salvatore Agnelli, 1839)
Il convitato di pietra (set by Giacomo Tritto, 1783; set by Vincenzo Fabrizi, 1787)
La scuffiara (set by Giacomo Tritto, 1784)
L'apparenza inganna ossia La villeggiatura (set by Domenico Cimarosa, 1784)
Il marito disperato (set by Domenico Cimarosa, 1785)
La finta zingara (set by Pietro Alessandro Guglielmi, 1785)
Le sventure fortunate (set by Pietro Alessandro Guglielmi, 1785)
La modista raggiratrice (basato su Il Filippo di Gennaro Antonio Federico; set by Giovanni Paisiello, 1787)
Le vane gelosie (set by Giovanni Paisiello, 1790)
Il dottorato di Pulcinella (set by Giuseppe Farinelli, 1792)
La serva onorata (basato su Le nozze di Figaro di Lorenzo Da Ponte; set by Niccolò Piccinni, 1792)
Le fallaci apparenze (set by Gennaro Astarita, 1793)
La pietra simpatica (set by Silvestro Palma, 1795)
Gli amanti ridicoli (set by Silvestro Palma, 1797)
Don Anchise campione (set by Johann Nepomuk Hummel, 1800)
L'equivoco (set by Pietro Casella, 1804)
Le seguaci di Diana (set by Silvestro Palma, 1805)

References

External links

Italian opera librettists
1721 births
1807 deaths
18th-century Neapolitan people
Italian male dramatists and playwrights
19th-century Neapolitan people